The Women's U23 road race at the 2007 European Road Championships took place on July 21. The Championships were hosted in Sofia, Bulgaria. The course was 112 km long and started in the morning.

Final classification

41 riders were classified ex-aequo at the 11th position, because the video camera didn't work correctly.

References

External links

2007 European Road Championships
2007 in women's road cycling
European Road Championships – Women's U23 road race